Belair or Bélair may refer to:

People
Sanité Bélair (1781–1802), Haitian freedom fighter

Places

Historic locations
Belair (Nashville, Tennessee), United States
Belair Development, Maryland, United States
Belair Mansion (Bowie, Maryland), United States

Inhabited places

Australia
Belair, South Australia
Belair National Park, South Australia

United States
Bellair, Clay County, Florida
Belair, Leon County, Florida
Belair, Georgia
Bel Air, Harford County, Maryland
Belair, South Carolina

Other inhabited places
Belair, Luxembourg
Belair Park, London, England

Other uses
Belair (airline), an airline in Switzerland
Belair Stud a horseracing dynasty in Collington, Maryland
Château Bélair-Monange, formerly Château Belair, a Bordeaux wine producer in Saint-Émilion, France

See also
Bel Air (disambiguation)
Bel-Aire (disambiguation)
Belair, Florida (disambiguation)
Belair Mansion (disambiguation)
Bellair (disambiguation)
Bellairs, a surname
Belleair (disambiguation)
Bellaire (disambiguation)